Ferris Olin is an American feminist scholar, curator, educator and librarian. Olin was born in Trenton, New Jersey, on June 27, 1948. She has been a Professor Art and Library Science in the Rutgers University School of Arts and Sciences since 1976. With Judith K. Brodsky, Olin co-founded, and co-directed several initiatives and institutions, including the Institute for Women and Art, the Women Artists Archive National Directory, the Miriam Schapiro Archives on Women Artists, and the Feminist Art Project. She was the founding director of the Margery Somers Foster Center: A Resource Center and Digital Archive on Women, Scholarship and Leadership at Rutgers University. In 1975, Olin worked on a design team to found the Training Institute for the Sex Desegregation of the Public Schools in New Jersey, United States, as well as the Virgin Islands and Puerto Rico.

Education
She studied art history, women’s studies and library science at Douglass College and Rutgers University.

Publications and exhibitions
Olin co-authored, with Judith K. Brodsky, the book The Fertile Crescent: Gender, Art, Art and Society (2012). Olin and Brodsky co-curated a parallel exhibition at the Princeton University Art Museum, which included the work of Shirin Neshat, Laila Shawa, Mona Hatoum, and Parastou Forouhar.

Books and exhibition catalogs

Awards and honors
Olin was awarded a Women's Caucus for Art Lifetime Achievement Award in 2012. In 1980, Olin received a grant from the National Endowment for the Humanities to found, at Radcliffe College, the Women in the Community Project.

References

1948 births
Living people
Women art historians
American feminist writers
Rutgers University alumni
American art historians
Douglass College alumni
Rutgers University faculty
American women historians
21st-century American women
American women curators
American curators